Brachychilus literatus is a species of beetle in the family Cerambycidae. It was described by Blanchard in 1851. It is known from Chile.

References

Phacellini
Beetles described in 1851
Beetles of South America
Endemic fauna of Chile
Arthropods of Chile